Ariosoma dolichopterum is a species of fish found in Central Vietnam. It has about 127–131 vertebrae. It is closely related to A. anago and 30 specimens were seized upon its description.

References 

dolichopterum
Fish described in 2015